Seondeok of Silla may refer to:

People
Queen Seondeok of Silla, reigned 632–647
King Seondeok of Silla, reigned 780–785

Media
Queen Seondeok (TV series), 2009 South Korean historical drama TV series.